Jacquilyn Louise "Jackie" Fairweather (née Gallagher; 10 November 1967 1 November 2014) was an Australian world champion triathlete, long-distance runner, coach and Australian Institute of Sport high-performance administrator.

Personal life
Jacquilyn Louise Gallagher was born on 10 November 1967 in Perth. Her parents were Delys and Martin, and she had two younger brothers: Matthew and Joshua. In 1979, whilst living in Sydney, she became involved in Little Athletics. She moved to Brisbane in the mid-1980s; and, in 1989, she completed a Bachelor of Human Movement Studies (First Class Honours) at the University of Queensland. In 1991, she completed a Master of Science (Exercise Physiology and Cardiac Rehabilitation) at the Eastern Illinois University. In 2001, she moved to Canberra to take up the position of Head Coach of the newly established Australian Institute of Sport triathlon program. In 2004, she married Simon Fairweather, Australian archery gold medalist from the 2000 Sydney Olympics.

Triathlon career
Fairweather began competing in triathlons in 1992 and won the elite Australian National Series in her first season. She spent eight years as a professional triathlete. In 1996 she became the world triathlon champion, setting a championship record time of 1 hour 50 minutes 52 seconds in Cleveland, Ohio, United States. She also won the World Duathlon Championships in 1996 to become the only person ever to win both world titles in the same year.

Fairweather won the Duathlon World Championships again in 1999, but she missed repeating the double when she placed 2nd to Loretta Harrop in the Triathlon World Championship. Gallagher collected further World Championship silver medals in 1995 and 1997.

Distance running career
After finishing 11th in her first-ever marathon, in Boston, she won the bronze medal in the marathon at the 2002 Commonwealth Games. In 2005, she won the Gold Coast Marathon.

IAAF Personal Bests

Sports administration
In 2001, Fairweather was appointed to the position of Head Coach of the newly established Australian Institute of Sport triathlon program. From 2005 to her death on 2014, she held senior sport administration positions with the Australian Sports Commission /Australian Institute of Sport. These positions primarily assisted the high performance programs of national sports organisations.

Fairweather played a major role in triathlon administration and positions included: Triathlon Australia national elite selector, International Triathlon Union (ITU) Athletes Committee (1998–2002) athlete member, ITU Women's Committee member (1997–98) and Triathlon Australia Board Member (first ever athletes' representative) (1998–2001).

Death
On 4 November 2014, it was announced that Fairweather had died by suicide at the age of 46 on 1 November 2014, nine days before her 47th birthday. Her death led to many former athletes recognizing her achievements.

Her main Australian triathlon rival in the 1990s, Emma Carney, said: "Jackie was a perfectionist[,] and I think perhaps Jackie never really appreciatedor realisedall that she achieved. It wasn't just the races she won, or the sports she excelled in – Jackie was a pioneer in Australian triathlon coaching and administration."

Emma Snowsill, 2008 Beijing Olympics Women's Triathlon gold medalist, commented that "You shared and cared in your knowledge and passion for our sport more than anyone[,] Jackie Fairweather. “Not only a hero for your athletic abilities, but your generosity to help many up-and-coming athletes to pave a way for themselves and the future of the sport is second to none…" Snowsill was a member of Fairweather's Australian Institute of Sport triathlon squad.

Her Memorial Service was held at the AIS Arena with more than 600 people attending. The location was apt, as it was where Jackie worked for 13 years and met her husband Simon.

Recognition
Australian Triathlete of the Year 1993 & 1996
Australian Sports Woman of the Year (Confederation of Australian Sport) 1996
Australian Sports Medal 2000
Triathlon Australia Hall of Fame 2012
International Triathlon Union Hall of Fame 2017

References

External links

Jackie Fairweather (Gallagher) at Australian Athletics Historical Results
Vale Jackie Fairweather NSW Athletics

1967 births
2014 deaths
Australian female triathletes
Australian female long-distance runners
Australian female marathon runners
Commonwealth Games medallists in athletics
Commonwealth Games bronze medallists for Australia
Athletes (track and field) at the 2002 Commonwealth Games
Australian Institute of Sport coaches
Australian Institute of Sport administrators
Recipients of the Australian Sports Medal
University of Queensland alumni
Eastern Illinois University alumni
Athletes from Perth, Western Australia
Female sports coaches
2014 suicides
Medallists at the 2002 Commonwealth Games